War elephants were used in Iranian military history, most notably in Achaemenid, Seleucid and Sasanian periods. The elephants were Asian elephants, and were recruited from southern provinces of Iran and India but also possibly Syrian elephants from Syria and westernmost Iran.

The men (excluding the driver) sat in a large tower from which troops would fight. The elephant itself would normally be armed with thin plate armour (the Sassanids used chain mail as well as thin plate armour) and would bear a large crenelated wooden howdah on its back. Persian war elephants were trained by their rider, called a mahout, who would also ride the elephant into battle. While on the move, the elephants required large paths to cut to accommodate their passage. Training elephants was a difficult task and their upkeep was expensive because of their high nutritional demands.

History

Under the Achaemenids

Persians used war elephants  at the Battle of Gaugamela in 331 BC. The battle raged  between king Alexander the Great of Macedon and king Darius III of Persia. The Persians had 15 Indian-trained war elephants, which were placed at the centre of the Persian line, and they made such an impression on the Macedonian troops that Alexander felt the need to sacrifice to the God of Fear  the night before the battle. Despite this the Persians lost the battle, relinquishing the Achaemenid empire to Alexander.

Some claim that they had been used previously in the Greek campaign of King Xerxes I of Persia, and even further back at the time of Darius the Great at the Indus, the Danube and against the Scythians in 512 BC.  Neither Xenophon nor Herodotus mention war elephants in their accounts of these earlier campaigns.

Under the Parthians

Since the early 1st century AD, elephants were also used as a symbol of kingship in Iran. This notion was adopted from the Greco-Bactrians.

Under the Sasanians

In the early Sasanian period, the war elephants were used in battles as a psychological weapon for its terrorizing effects. Later this role evolved into a logistical one, and in late Sasanian period they were used by army commanders to survey the battle scene.

Sasanian elephants were under a special chief, known as the Zend−hapet, or "Commander of the Indians", as they were from India.

Shapur I may have used war elephants against Valerian. But the beasts were most notably used in Shapur II's forces. Emperor Julian mentions their use in the wars of 337–361, which he described them to be Indian elephants and carried "iron towers full of archers" (possibly hyperbole; he was not an eye-witness to the particular battle he described). The elephants were later used by the Sasanians against Julian during his campaign in 363, including at Ctesiphon, Samarra, and later in a surprise attack on Jovian's forces. The eye-witness Ammianus Marcellinus describes the beasts as "gleaming elephants with ... cruel gaping jaws, pungent smell, and strange appearance"; at Ctesiphon, they were placed behind the Sasanian ranks, looking like "walking hills" that "by the movements of their enormous bodies, ... threatened destruction to all who came near them, dreaded as they were from past experience". But these instances were all results of "dire necessity rather than normal deployment", as they usually had little tactical impact, especially in pitched battles. When they were used in pitched battles, the elephants were usually positioned in the rear, in contrast to the classical Carthaginian and Hellenistic practices.

The Sasanian elephants were most effective in siege warfare against fortified cities, where they probably carried turrets or howdahs and were used as shooting platforms. Procopius has mentioned wooden turrets that allowed the Sasanians to tower over the walls of a besieged city and shoot arrows. During the Lazic War, Mihr-Mihroe's eight elephants proved effective in the sieges of Archaeopolis and other Lazic fortifications.

Miscellaneous applications of the elephants by the Sasanians are also reported; Agathias mentions their use to blockade a river in one occasion.

In the Battle of the Bridge near the fall of the Sasanian Empire, the Sasanians under Bahman Jaduyah used their elite Zhayedan forces, which included war elephants, against the invading Arab Muslims under Abu Ubaid al-Thaqafi. A white elephant tore the latter from his horse with its trunk, and trampled him underfoot. The Arab Muslims suffered heavy casualties in the battle. The elephants was also used in the Battle of al-Qādisiyyah, but was unsuccessful.

Later dynasties

The war elephants were also used by Saffarids, Ghaznavids, Buyids to a lesser extent, and also by Khwarezmids in the Samarkand area. The Timurids also used them in the Battle of Ankara.

In popular culture

 Shatranj (chess) – which modern chess has gradually developed from, same as Indian chess, includes the war elephant with the name fil (meaning "elephant" in Persian) as the bishop.
 The Persian civilisation in the real-time strategy computer game Age of Empires II has war elephants as their unique unit, in reference to this period in history. War elephants are also available to the Persians in Age of Empires and are granted fast movement.

See also

 War elephant
 Crushing by elephant
 Sassanid army
 History of elephants in Europe
 List of historical elephants
 Military animals
 Cavalry tactics

References

Further reading

External links
http://www.iranian.com/main/2011/jul/ancient-world-war-0
http://www.iranchamber.com/history/parthians/parthians.php
http://www.artarena.force9.co.uk/sass2.htm

Military history of Iran
Ghaznavid Empire
Military units and formations of the Achaemenid Empire
Cavalry units and formations of the Sassanian Empire
Elephants in culture
War elephants